A list of mainland Chinese films released in 1994:

See also 
 1994 in China

References

External links
IMDb list of Chinese films

Chinese
Films
1994